Dracula venosa is a species of orchid.

References 

venosa